Murciano is a Spanish surname. Notable people with the surname include:

Carlos Murciano (born 1931), Spanish poet and author
Enrique Murciano (born 1973), American actor
Marianne Murciano, American television personality

Spanish-language surnames
Spanish toponymic surnames